Magnus Powermouse is a children's novel by Dick King-Smith, first published by Gollancz in 1982 with illustrations by Mary Rayner.

Plot

Magnus Powermouse was a large mouse, who gains supermouse strength fattened on patent Porker Pills.

Reception
The book received a positive review from Kirkus Reviews.

References

1982 British novels
1982 children's books
British children's novels
Books about mice and rats
Novels about cats
Victor Gollancz Ltd books
Novels by Dick King-Smith